Valeriano Pompeo Maurizio "Valerio" Arri (22 June 1892 – 31 March 1970) was an Italian marathon runner. He won a bronze medal at the 1920 Olympics in his all-time personal best time of 2:36:33.

Biography
Arri started competing in early 1910s, but had his first major successes in 1919, when he won the Turin Marathon in a time of 2:40:47.6 and the national title over 48 km, in a time of 3:13:41. His career declined after the 1920 Olympics – he placed fourth in 1921 and third in 1923 at the Turin Marathon. Since 1996, the “Premio Valerio Arri” has been awarded to honor the winner of that race.

References

External links
 

1892 births
1970 deaths
Italian male long-distance runners
Italian male marathon runners
Athletes (track and field) at the 1920 Summer Olympics
Olympic athletes of Italy
Olympic bronze medalists for Italy
Medalists at the 1920 Summer Olympics
Olympic bronze medalists in athletics (track and field)